Local elections will be held in the Province of Sarangani on May 9, 2022, within the Philippine general election. Voters will select candidates for all local positions: a town mayor, vice mayor and town councilors, as well as members of the Sangguniang Panlalawigan, the vice-governor, governor and a representative for the lone district of Sarangani.

Provincial Elections
The candidates for governor and vice governor with the highest number of votes wins the seat; they are voted separately, therefore, they may be of different parties when elected.

Candidates for Governor
Governor Steve Solon is term-limited and is vying for the congressional seat instead. His party nominated congressman Rogelio Ruel Pacquiao.

Parties are as stated in their certificate of candidacies.

Candidates for Vice Governor
Parties are as stated in their certificate of candidacies.

Candidates for Congressman
Parties are as stated in their certificate of candidacies.

Sangguniang Panlalawigan Elections
All 2 Districts of Sarangani will elect Sangguniang Panlalawigan or provincial board members.

1st District (West Coast)
Municipalities: Kiamba, Maitum, Maasim
Parties are as stated in their certificate of candidacies.

|-

2nd District (East Coast)
Municipalities: Alabel, Glan, Malapatan, Malungon
Parties are as stated in their certificate of candidacies.

|-

|-

Mayoralty Elections
All municipalities of Sarangani will elect mayor and vice-mayor this election. The candidates for mayor and vice mayor with the highest number of votes wins the seat; they are voted separately, therefore, they may be of different parties when elected. Below is the list of mayoralty candidates of each city and municipalities per district.

1st District (West Coast)
Municipalities: Kiamba, Maasim, Maitum

Kiamba

Maasim

Maitum

2nd District (East Coast)
Municipalities: Alabel, Glan, Malapatan, Malungon

Alabel

Glan

Malapatan

Malungon

References

2022 Philippine local elections
Elections in Sarangani
May 2022 events in the Philippines